In general, Belgium has a well-developed legal and institutional framework for fighting against corruption.

Extent 
On Transparency International's 2022 Corruption Perceptions Index, Belgium scored 73 on a scale from 0 ("highly corrupt") to 100 ("very clean"). When ranked by score, Belgium ranked 18th among the 180 countries in the Index, where the country ranked first is perceived to have the most honest public sector.  For comparison, the best score was 90 (ranked 1), the worst score was 12 (ranked 180), and the average score was 43.

Nonetheless, public trust in the civil service and judiciary is low, and the perception of corruption is extremely high in Belgium. Over 65% of people in Belgium think corruption is a problem. Over 70% think the government is at least to a large extent, or even entirely, run by a few big entities acting in their own best interests. There are areas that could be improved. For instance, whistleblower protection needs further improvement. It has been recommended that the process of anti-corruption policy implementation should also actively engage private sectors.

Dictator sanctuary accusations 
Belgium offered a post-presidency retirement sanctuary for Rafael Correa, former president of Ecuador, who was investigated for massive corruption as soon as he left office. In January 2019, Ecuadorean president Lenin Moreno said that nearly half of $4.9 billion in oil infrastructure investment made during the administration of previous president Correa was stolen via corruption. Over 317 officials who served in Correa's administration were suspected of corruption. Correa was president of Ecuador between 2007 and 2017. He immediately moved to Belgium when his term was over.

See also 
 Crime in Belgium
 Police corruption in Belgium
 Agusta scandal (1993–98)
Dioxin Affair
Marc Dutroux

References

External links
Belgium Corruption Profile from the Business Anti-Corruption Portal

 
Belgium
Politics of Belgium